1903 in philosophy

Events

Publications 
 Konstantin Tsiolkovsky, The Exploration of Cosmic Space by Means of Reaction Devices (1903)
 Georg Simmel, The Metropolis and Mental Life (1903)
 W. E. B. Du Bois, The Souls of Black Folk (1903)
 G. E. Moore, Principia Ethica (1903) and The Refutation of Idealism (1903)

Births 
 February 22 - Frank Ramsey (died 1930)
 May 10 - Hans Jonas (died 1993)
 September 11 - Theodor W. Adorno (died 1969)

Deaths 
 October 4 - Otto Weininger (born 1880)
 November 1 - Theodor Mommsen  (born 1817)
 December 8 - Herbert Spencer (born 1820)

References 

Philosophy
20th-century philosophy
Philosophy by year